Edward Oliver Chandler  (February 17, 1917 – July 6, 2003) was a pitcher in Major League Baseball. He pitched in fifteen games for the Brooklyn Dodgers during the 1947 baseball season. 

Born in Pinson, Alabama, Chandler's family was huge, of him being one in 14 sons. His father was William M, and his mother was Susie Caroline Chandler.

References

External links
 or Baseball Almanac, or Retrosheet
Venezuelan Professional Baseball League statistics
Ed Chandler's SABR bio

1917 births
2003 deaths
Baseball players from Alabama
Brooklyn Dodgers players
Fort Worth Cats players
Los Angeles Angels (minor league) players
Major League Baseball pitchers
Patriotas de Venezuela players
Pocatello Cardinals players
St. Paul Saints (AA) players
San Francisco Seals (baseball) players